Upper crust most commonly refers to:
 The upper class in modern societies; the social class composed of the wealthiest members of society, who also wield the greatest political power.

Upper crust may also refer to:

Restaurants
 Upper Crust Pizzeria, a pizza chain in Boston
 Upper Crust (restaurant chain), a chain of European baguette (sandwich) restaurants

Other uses
 The Upper Crust (rock band), a Boston-based hard rock band
 Crust (geology), the earth's (or another body's) geological solid outer shell.  The upper crust is the planet's surface.
 The Upper Crust, a 1917 American film.
Bradley Uppercrust III from the Goofy Movie 2, release February 29, 2000.

See also